Henry Edward John Stanley, 3rd Baron Stanley of Alderley and 2nd Baron Eddisbury or Abdul Rahman Stanley, (11 July 1827 – 11 December 1903), was a British historian who translated The first voyage round the world by Magellan and other works from the Age of Discovery. A convert to Islam, in 1869 Lord Stanley became the first Muslim member of the House of Lords.

Life

In or before 1859, Stanley converted to Islam and may have adopted the name Abdul Rahman. He likely converted to Islam while traveling in the Islamosphere in the 1850s, as well as having conducting his Hajj to Mecca. Lord Stanley was the first Muslim member of the House of Lords, inheriting his titles in 1869 upon the death of his father, Edward John Stanley, 2nd Baron Stanley of Alderley. His mother, Henrietta Stanley, Baroness Stanley of Alderley, was an English educationist, while his sister Katharine was the mother of Bertrand Russell. His younger brother Edward Lyulph Stanley succeeded him.

As alcohol is forbidden in Islam, he apparently ordered the closure of all public houses on his estate in Nether Alderley, south of Alderley Edge (then named Chorley). Despite his new faith, he funded the restoration on Anglesey of St Mary's Church, Bodewryd, Llanbadrig Church in Cemaes, St Dona's Church, Llanddona and St Peirio's Church, Rhosbeirio.

He took part in three marriage ceremonies with Fabia, daughter of Santiago Federico San Roman of Seville — firstly in 1862, secondly on 6 November 1869 at the registry office of the parish of St George's, Hanover Square and finally on 15 May 1874 at the Roman Catholic Church of St Alban, Macclesfield. Although she was apparently received as his wife in Britain, Fabia turned out to be identical to Serafina Fernandez y Funes, of Alcaudete, Jaén, Spain, who had, on 30 September 1851 married Ramon Peres y Abril (died 16 May 1870), so that the first two marriage ceremonies were bigamous.

Death
He died and was buried on two of the most auspicious dates in the Muslim calendar, 21 and 25 Ramadan (11 and 15 December 1903 respectively). He was buried according to Muslim rites in unconsecrated ground in the garden of the Dower House on his family's estate, Alderley Park, at Nether Alderley, Cheshire. The chief mourner at his burial was the first secretary to the Ottoman Embassy in London. Islamic prayers were recited over his grave by the embassy's imam. A Janaza service in memory of the deceased was held at the Liverpool Mosque, conducted by Abdullah Quilliam.

In the issue of the Review of Religions for February 1904, the death of Lord Stanley was reported;

The Crescent gave the following account of his interment;

According to Nancy Mitford, at the funeral, his brother turned to the new Lord Stanley, who had removed his hat out of respect, and snapped "Not your hat, you fool, your boots."

Books
His books were published by the Hakluyt Society, of which he was a member and vice-president. He wrote under the name Hon. Henry E. J. Stanley while his father was alive and Lord Stanley of Alderley after he acceded to that title.
 1866/1995/2001: A description of the Coasts of East Africa and Malabar in the beginning of the sixteenth century by Duarte Barbosa, a Portuguese, translator
 1868/1964/2001: The Philippine Islands, Moluccas, Siam, Cambodia, Japan, and China, at the close of the sixteenth century. by Antonio de Morga, translator
 1869/1963: The Three Voyages of Vasco da Gama, and His Viceroyalty from the Lendas da India of Gaspar Correa, translator
 1873/1963: Travels to Tana and Persia by Josafa Barbaro and Ambrosio Contarini, editor
 1874/1963/2001: The First Voyage Round the World, by Magellan translator
 1881/1970: Narrative of the Portuguese embassy to Abyssinia during the years 1520-1527 by Father Francisco Alvarez translator and editor; republished 1961 as The Prester John of The Indies - A True Relation of The Lands of The Prester John, the narrative of the Portuguese Embassy to Ethiopia in 1520 by Father Francisco Alvares

References

External links
 
 

1827 births
1903 deaths
19th-century English historians
20th-century English people
English Muslims
Barons Stanley of Alderley
Eldest sons of British hereditary barons
Converts to Islam
Henry